XHNAT-TDT is a Grupo Multimedios owned and operated station in Nuevo Laredo, Tamaulipas. The station is primarily affiliated to Multimedios Plus. It serves the Laredo, Texas — Nuevo Laredo areas. When XHNAT first went on the air it was a Galavisión-rebroadcaster Televisa affiliate, part of the Grupo Multimedios concession of 1994, before they decided to switch to their own television network Multimedios Televisión. Milenio TV and Teleritmo are available on its subchannels 45.2 and 45.3.

Digital television
On July 4, 2011, XHNAT started to broadcast in digital in 1080i format High Definition with an ERP of 54 kW; the station used virtual channel 45. Later in 2012 when Multimedios debuted Multimedios Plus, XHNAT as well as other Multimedios Plus stations switched to standard-definition television with a resolution of 480i. The station's digital signal is multiplexed. XHNAT began testing its two new subchannels 45.2 and 45.3 on April 16, 2013, but it was not until February 7, 2014 that XHNAT began programming them with news network Milenio TV on channel 45.2 in 1080i HD and Norteño music network Teleritmo on channel 45.3 in standard definition. On February 24, 2018, its virtual channel re-located to channel 6 as part of Multimedios' nationwide coverage push.

Programming 
XHNAT broadcasts local-specific newshours of Multimedios's Telediario newscasts for the Two Laredos substituting for those originated from Monterrey, the first airing between 8:00 a.m.-9:00 a.m. CST in the fourth hour of Telediario Matutino, and 8:00 p.m.-9:00 p.m. as a substitution for the second hour of Telediario Nocturno, along with local traffic and weather updates during the network's hourly Telediario updates known as Telediario Al Minuto. Sports programming includes basketball games from the Liga Nacional de Baloncesto Profesional's Nuevo Laredo Bulls, and the Segunda División's Bravos de Nuevo Laredo.

References

External links
Multimedios TV website 

Spanish-language television stations in Mexico
Canal 6 (Mexico)
HNAT-TDT